Mitsuda (written: 光田) is a Japanese surname. Notable people with the surname include:

Ken Mitsuda (1902–1997), Japanese actor
Kensuke Mitsuda (1876–1964), Japanese leprologist
Takuya Mitsuda (born 1965), Japanese manga artist
Yasunori Mitsuda (born 1972), Japanese composer, musician and sound producer

Japanese-language surnames